Where It All Begins is the eleventh studio album by the Allman Brothers Band.  "No One to Run With" obtained the most album-oriented rock airplay, while "Soulshine", written by Warren Haynes, gained success as a concert and fan favorite.  Gregg Allman also started to confront his substance abuse problems in the past on songs such as "All Night Train". The album sold considerably better than its predecessor, Shades of Two Worlds.  In 1998, the album went Gold. Nevertheless, critical reception was weaker.  This was also the last studio album the group recorded with original guitarist Dickey Betts.

Producer Tom Dowd, in an effort to relieve Gregg Allman's dislike of recording in the studio, arranged for the band's full concert stage setup to be assembled in a Florida film soundstage owned by actor Burt Reynolds.  This allowed the band to record all the songs for the album live as a unit instead of recording their parts individually.

Where It All Begins features the 1992 to 1997 lineup of the Allman Brothers Band – Gregg Allman on keyboards and vocals, Dickey Betts on guitar and vocals, Warren Haynes on guitar and vocals, Allen Woody on bass, Butch Trucks on drums, Jaimoe on drums, and Marc Quiñones on congas and percussion.

Reception

The album received mixed to positive reviews from critics. Paul Evans of Rolling Stone described the album as "Twin leads, Two drummers, an impossibly soulful vocalist — no American band ever emerged with the sheer power of the Allmans. It's the tragedy of these terrific players that, ever since the long-ago deaths of Duane Allman and Berry Oakley, their albums have only echoed — clearly or confusedly — their original boom. This time out, Gregg's world-weary singing and guitarist Dickey Betts' country inclinations get subsumed too often in formula blooze. But there's no denying stellar jamming. Give the Brothers any obvious three-chord sequence, and they soar, spinning solos and building percussive thunder." Bruce Eder of AllMusic gave it 3 stars out of 5, noting "After a year of personal and personnel problems, the Allman Brothers Band got back together to record the surprisingly consistent live-in-the-studio venture Where It All Begins. It lacks the ambition and stretch of Seven Turns or Shades of Two Worlds, along with their peaks, but it is still a solidly consistent album, driven by some of the virtues of live spontaneity. Highlights include Gregg Allman's frank drug song "All Night Train," the Bo Diddley-beat-driven "No One to Run With," and the glorious dual-guitar workout "Back Where It All Begins." John Metzger of The Music Box gave it four stars out of 5, saying "One of the most notable albums to be released in the past month is the Allman Brothers Band's Where It All Begins. The group has had several solid studio efforts over the past few years with Shades of Two Worlds and Seven Turns. Its latest outing, however, easily blows these two away, and returns the Allman Brothers Band to its prime."

Track listing
"All Night Train" (Gregg Allman, Warren Haynes, Chuck Leavell) – 4:04
"Sailin' 'Cross the Devil's Sea" (Allman, Haynes, Allen Woody, Jack Pearson) – 4:57
"Back Where It All Begins" (Dickey Betts) – 9:12
"Soulshine" (Warren Haynes) – 6:44
"No One to Run With" (Dickey Betts, John Prestia) – 5:59
"Change My Way of Living" (Dickey Betts) – 6:15
"Mean Woman Blues" (Dickey Betts) – 5:01
"Everybody's Got a Mountain to Climb" (Dickey Betts) – 4:01
"What's Done Is Done" (Gregg Allman, Allen Woody) – 4:09
"Temptation Is a Gun" (Gregg Allman, Jonathan Cain, Neal Schon) – 5:37

Personnel
The Allman Brothers Band
Gregg Allman – Hammond B-3 organ, piano, lead vocals
Dickey Betts – lead and rhythm guitar, acoustic guitar, lead vocals
Jaimoe – drums, percussion, background vocals
Butch Trucks – drums, percussion, background vocals
Warren Haynes – lead, rhythm, and slide guitar, lead and background vocals
Allen Woody – bass, fretless bass, six-string bass, background vocals
Marc Quiñones – congas, percussion
Production
Produced by Tom Dowd
Recording, mixing: Jay Mark
Mastering: Vlado Meller
Recording engineers: David Hewitt, Phil Gitomer, Sean McClintock
Digital editing engineer: Andrew Roshberg

Charts

Weekly Charts

Certifications

References

1994 albums
The Allman Brothers Band albums
Albums produced by Tom Dowd
Epic Records albums